Jonas Schmidt-Chanasit (born 25 March 1979) is a German virologist and Professor of Arbovirology at the University of Hamburg. Schmidt-Chanasit is also the Deputy Director of the WHO Collaborating Centre for Arbovirus and Haemorrhagic Fever Reference and Research at the Bernhard Nocht Institute for Tropical Medicine.

Early career
Schmidt-Chanasit was born in Pankow, Berlin. He earned his MD from Charité Medical School in 2006. After defending his thesis on "Development and evaluation of serological assays for the detection of human infections by New World hantaviruses imported to Europe" he worked as a student at the Kasetsart University in Bangkok. From 2008 he began to work as a postdoctoral researcher at the Institute for Medical Virology of Goethe University in Frankfurt am Main, where he gained his post-doctoral qualification (habilitation) in virology, in 2010. Schmidt-Chanasit has been leading the WHO Collaborating Centre for Arbovirus and Haemorrhagic Fever Reference and Research at the Bernhard Nocht Institute for Tropical Medicine in Hamburg since 2010. In 2018, Schmidt-Chanasit became Professor of Arbovirology at the University of Hamburg. The research groups led by Schmidt-Chanasit work on Emerging and Reemerging viruses (e.g. Ebola virus, Borna virus, Zika virus or Usutu virus). In this context, one main focus is on viruses that are transmitted by mosquitos. In particular, he investigates the interaction between arboviruses and their vectors. Furthermore, he also develop models to better predict arbovirus epidemics. Schmidt-Chanasit has identified several new viral pathogens  and is author of more than 200 scientific papers, including journals like The New England Journal of Medicine and The Lancet.

Schmidt-Chanasit is married, father of a son and a daughter and lives with his family in Berlin and Bangkok.

References 

1979 births
Living people
Physicians from Berlin
German virologists
Academic staff of the University of Hamburg